Mishmar HaYarden (lit. Guard of the Jordan) is a moshav in northern Israel. Located in the Korazim Plateau, on Highway 91 between Mahanayim and Gadot, it falls under the jurisdiction of Mevo'ot HaHermon Regional Council.

History
Mishmar HaYarden was founded in 1949 on land of the newly depopulated Palestinian village of Yarda.

Mishmar HaYarden  was originally named "Bnei Tzfat" because the founding nucleus supported the people of Safed (Tzfat) and respected them for planning in the 1870s to establish moshavot in the Bashan, including the old Bnei Yehuda. It was later renamed after the Mishmar HaYarden moshava, which was destroyed during the 1948 Arab–Israeli War.

References

Moshavim
Populated places in Northern District (Israel)
1949 establishments in Israel
Populated places established in 1949